Vilma Raquel López de Paz (born 4 September 1989) is a Guatemalan footballer who plays as a forward. She has been a member of the Guatemala women's national team.

Club career
López has played for Amatitlán in Guatemala.

International career
López capped for Guatemala at senior level during the 2013 Central American Games. She was also called-up to the 2014 CONCACAF Women's Championship, but did not play any match.

International goals
Scores and results list Equatorial Guinea's goal tally first

References

1989 births
Living people
Guatemalan women's footballers
Women's association football forwards
Guatemala women's international footballers
Central American Games bronze medalists for Guatemala
Central American Games medalists in football